The province of Saskatchewan, Canada is divided into 18 census divisions according to Statistics Canada. Unlike in some other provinces, census divisions do not reflect the organization of local government in Saskatchewan. These areas exist solely for the purposes of statistical analysis and presentation; they have no government of their own.

Saskatchewan's census divisions consist of numerous census subdivisions which include subdivisions such as:
Urban municipalities (cities, towns, villages, and resort villages);
Rural municipalities;
Northern municipalities (northern towns, northern villages, and northern hamlets); and
Indian reserves

List of census divisions

See also
Administrative divisions of Canada
List of communities in Saskatchewan
 List of cities in Saskatchewan
List of Indian reserves in Saskatchewan
 List of resort villages in Saskatchewan
 List of rural municipalities in Saskatchewan
 List of towns in Saskatchewan
 List of villages in Saskatchewan

Notes

References

Census divisions